The Skies Revolt is an American Christian rock band, and they primarily play indie rock. They come from Grand Rapids, Michigan. The band started making music in 2004. They released, Some Kind of Cosmonaut, a studio album, in 2012.

Background
The Skies Revolt is a Christian rock band from Grand Rapids, Michigan. Their members are vocalist and guitarist, Dave Prindle, vocalist and bassist, Jarred Irby, vocalist and guitarist, Bobby Dowell, and vocalist and drummer, Eli DenBesten.

Music history
The band commenced as a musical entity in 2004 and released their first album, Some Sort of War in 2006. Their latest album, Some Kind of Cosmonaut,  was released on January 10, 2012, with Robotic Records.

Members
Current members
 Dave Prindle - vocals, guitar
 Jarred Irby - vocals, guitar, bass, drums, psychologist, black guy
 Bobby Dowell - vocals, guitar
 Eli DenBesten - vocals, drums

Past members
Adam Murphy - vocals, guitar, drums
Nate Donahue - vocals, guitar
Nathan "Pockets" Smith - vocals, drums, eye-candy
David Vining Jr - vocals, bass
Brett Hull - vocals, drums, slapshots
Steve Ryan - vocals, bass

Discography
Albums
 Some Kind of Cosmonaut (January 10, 2012, Robotic)
 Plastic Revolution (June 2010)
 Is Alive and Well (April 2008)
 Kamikaze Romantic Thoughts (November 2007)
 Some Sort of War (December 2006)

References

External links
Official website

Musical groups from Michigan
2004 establishments in Michigan
Musical groups established in 2004